D.I.C.E. (DNA Integrated Cybernetic Enterprises) is an English language-originated anime series produced by Bandai Entertainment,  Xebec, and Studio Galapagos (computer animation). Originally made for the United States, the series was first shown on Cartoon Network in the US, then YTV in Canada.  On December 12, 2005, the Japanese version was shown on Animax under the title . On January 7, 2006, the Tagalog version premiered on Hero TV. ABS-CBN network followed by broadcasting the series in Tagalog on January 28, 2006. As of October 31, 2009, D.I.C.E. has already run for a total of 15 full runs in the 4 channels which broadcast D.I.C.E. in the Philippines.

Story

In the Sarbylion galaxy, there is an organization named D.I.C.E. (an acronym for DNA Integrated Cybernetic Enterprises) to help those in need. Among them, F-99 is the only unit composed entirely of children. Often being trivialized by their young ages, DICE member use RADOC to summon the Gild suit (Gild jacket) to help them to gain some respect among suspicious locals. When a problem arises, DICE is called to the rescue. With their Dinobreakers which can transform from Vehicle Mode to Dino Mode, the DICE team can always get the job done.

D.I.C.E. is sometimes compared with Thunderbirds, not only because of the rescue theme, but also the GTR catchphrase, which means "Good to Roll" (some prefer it as "got the request").

In the Japanese version of the show, D.I.C.E. stands for "Dinobrakers Integrated Cybernetic Enterprises."

Characters

D.I.C.E. members

Fortress F-99
Among D.I.C.E., the F-99 is run by children, specifically orphans. It has been said that all of them grew up in a time of war and that their families were victims of it.

A hot-headed pilot who always rushes into danger with little or no forethought. Despite his hot temper, Jet has a strong moral sense and isn't afraid to take risks to rescue those in need. His fierce competitive streak often leads to friction with his teammates. Jet's Dinobreaker is Motoraptor. (Age: 12) (Red)

Captain of F-99. As the second oldest member of the team, he is looked upon by his other teammates as an older brother. A well-respected and capable leader, Tak always stays calm and decisive even under enormous pressure. In episode 8, it was hinted that he and Marsha are dating. Tak's Dinobreaker is Dimetrover. (Age: 15) (Yellow)

Described best as "a pretty-boy pilot who is always concerned about his looks." As the pilot of the only flight-capable Dinobreaker Hoverptera, Robert is often sent to the front lines to scout the situation. Though Robert and Jet always compete over everything, they also make the best partners on the DICE F-99 team. It is shown often throughout the season that he is close friends with both Sam and Marco. (Age: 12) (Purple)

Jet's buddy in orphanage and a close friend of Robert. Always complaining about something, especially how cramped his cockpit is, Marco and his Dinobreaker Monocrawler are often assigned to heavy-duty tasks such as demolitions and heavy lifting. Despite his constant gripes, Marco always gets the job done. He can be relied on to solve tough situations and often remains calm and in control in bad situations. (Age: 12) (Blue)

Holds the position of data analysis expert on board F-99. She sees Marsha as an older sister figure and happens to be a bit of a shop-a-holic. She is sometimes temperamental and hates Jet to the core, however in the last episode of Season 2, when Jet was commissioned in the hospital after the final battle with the Immortal Pharaoh, she watched over and cared for him every day until he recovered, hinting that she has deeper feelings for him. Puffy can also guild up but does not have a dinobreaker. (Age: 12) (Pink)

A mechanical expert and another close friend of Robert. Though the youngest of the team, he is also referred to the brains of bunch. Sam drives the Dinobreaker Paratricar. He also prays in his free time and for the safety of his crew-mates (Age: 11) (Green)

Both the pilot and navigator of F-99. He is the giver of advice to anyone who seems to be troubled or upset, and is willing to speak out against his captain if he has to. (Age: 17) (Brown)

Serves as second-in-command of D.I.C.E. F-99. In episode 8, it was hinted that her and Tak are dating. Marsha can also guild up, but does not have a Dinobreaker. She is seen by all of her teammates as an older sister. (Age: 14) (Teal)

Randall
A tall blue android serving under DICE F-99.

Gelati
A short yellow android serving under D.I.C.E. F-99, often serves as Jet and Puffy's punching bag.

Chao Lee's pet. When Moke's parents were killed by poachers, Chao took on the responsibility of raising Moke. Moke only speaks Chao's name.

A new member from the Heron universe who is introduced in the second season.

Other D.I.C.E. members
Captain Spike Japanese 

A D.I.C.E. E-01 member. He always appears in his stylish hat (even when piloting his Dinobreaker Hoverrhynchus), and loves to brag about how it was tailor-made. In episode 7, Chao's pet moke stole his hat and ran through a dinner half naked to get it back. (Age:25) (Light Blue)

A member from D.I.C.E. Fortress C-01, His Dinobreaker is Lambeotracker. (Age:23) (Orange)

Commander Sid

Commander of the D.I.C.E. F station. His Dinobreaker is Mototyranno. (Green)

Phantom Knight (Phantom Black) (Japanese )

A mysterious "stranger" who always get into Jet's way and steals items related to the long-lost Heron civilization with his crew of space pirates. In episode 25, it was revealed that Phantom Knight is Jet's long lost brother Zack. The Phantom Knight is treated in a similar manner to "Racer X" from Speed Racer. His Dinobreaker is Knight Rex.

Body of Elders
A group of 12 men that are governing D.I.C.E. since its beginning. They make executive decisions for the organization. The Body of Elders also staged a conspiracy involving implanting wormhole detectors to Dinobreakers and use them to find Heron's Gate, kidnapping D.I.C.E. executives, staging war between D.I.C.E. factions, in an attempt to achieve immortality. They were presumably dead when they were trying to pass the temporarily closed Heron's Gate.

Heron Knights
The Heron Knights first appeared in Episode 27, during the show's second season. They are the guardians of the Heron Universe.

B-D.I.C.E. (B CORP)
B-D.I.C.E. is an organization that tries to discredit DICE by posing as DICE members. Without a convincing disguise, their tricks are easily uncovered. The famous slogan is We are B-D.I.C.E., but that doesn't mean we're nice!

Club
The taller of the Poker brothers.

Diamond
The shorter of the Poker brothers.

Laughing Boy
A B-DICE member that dressed like the Joker from poker.

Luigi
A Sitanian archaeologist working with B-D.I.C.E. to find the Sitan Kaleidoscope. After he had found the kaleidoscope, he and his former associate Falco were transported back in time, and was never seen again.

Dinobreakers
Dinobreakers are transformable mechanical creature used by a Dinorider. Dinobreaker transforms by calling it with the appended phrase "libertize." To keep their wild personalities under control, they only eat refined pellets. Feeding a Dinobreaker with raw pellet is a recipe that guarantees troubles! Among the Dinobreakers are:

Jet's Dinobreaker. Its vehicle form is a motorcycle and its dinosaur form is a Velociraptor.

Tak's Dinobreaker. Its vehicle form is a race car and its dinosaur form is a Dimetrodon.

Robert's Dinobreaker. Its vehicle mode is a hovercraft and its dinosaur form is a Pteranodon.

Marco's Dinobreaker. Its vehicle mode is a drill tank and its dinosaur form is a Monoclonius.

Sam's Dinobreaker. Its dinosaur form is a Parasaurolophus. Paratricar is capable of becoming invisible.

Captain Spike's Dinobreaker. Its dinosaur form is a Rhamphorhynchus.

Macchiatto's Dinobreaker. Its dinosaur form is a Lambeosaurus.

Commander Sid's Dinobreaker. Its vehicle form is a motorcycle and its dinosaur form is a Tyrannosaurus.

Phantom Knight's Dinobreaker. Its vehicle form is a race car and its dinosaur form is a Tyrannosaurus.

A mysterious purple Dinobreaker. Its dinosaur form is a mutant Velociraptor. It first appeared in episode 12 with its mysterious rider (a robot programmed to destroy Phantom Knight). Unlike other Dinobreakers, it does not need a phrase to transform. It also has several other "features" not common to D.I.C.E. Dinobreakers.

Tortoise Fortress
Chao's Dinobreaker. It usually assumes the form of Fortress F-99, but in critical times it can be used to combat giant creatures.

Knightbreakers
Knightbreakers are transforming mechanical creatures used by the Heron Knights. They are believed to be evolved Dinobreakers. Unlike Dinobreakers, they do not have a vehicle mode. Instead, they have a dino mode and a guardian mode which is humanoid. This transformation is triggered when a Heron Knight says the phrase "Knightbreak" and merges with the Knightbreaker.

Its dinosaur form is a Spinosaurus.

Its dinosaur form is a Velociraptor.

Its dinosaur form is a Stegosaurus.

Its dinosaur form is a Archaeopteryx.

Its dinosaur form is a Archaeopteryx.

Video Game
A video game based on this series was released for the PlayStation 2 in 2005.

Game Original Dinobreakers
 Hovertap Puffy's Dinobreaker. Its dinosaur form is a Tupuxuara.
 Ankylorover Marsha's Dinobreaker. Its dinosaur form is an Ankylosaurus.

Episodes

Season 1

Season 2

References

External links
 
 
 English D.I.C.E. PlayStation 2 audio samples at AudioAtrocities.com
 D.I.C.E in Xebec official site

Mecha anime and manga
2005 Japanese television series debuts
2005 Japanese television series endings
Japanese children's animated action television series
Japanese children's animated science fiction television series
Dinosaurs in anime and manga
Fictional robotic dinosaurs
Bandai Namco franchises
Bandai Entertainment anime titles
Xebec (studio)
Toonami
English-language television shows
Animated television series about orphans
Animated television series about robots
Anime with original screenplays